The following is a list of forts in the U.S. state of Vermont.

List of forts
Battery Redoubt 
Brattleboro Barracks
Camp Baxter (also known as Baxter Barracks)
Champlain Arsenal 
Chimney Point 
Cooke's Hill Fort
Fort Cassin 
Fort Defiance
Fort Dummer
Fort Ethan Allen 
Fort Frederick 
Fort Independence, located on Mount Independence 
Fort Loyal
Fort Mott 
Fort New Haven 
Fort Putney
Fort Ranger 
Fort Rutland
Fort Sainte Anne
Fort Warren 
Josiah Sartwell's Fort
Orlando Bridgman's Fort

See also
 List of forts in the United States

References
American Forts Network: Vermont

Lists of buildings and structures in Vermont
Vermont